Pseudopostega abrupta is a moth of the family Opostegidae. It is endemic to the West Indies, where it has been found on Guana Island and St. Thomas.

The length of the forewings is 2.5–3 mm. Adults are mostly white. Adults have been collected in March, July, October and November.

External links
A Revision of the New World Plant-Mining Moths of the Family Opostegidae (Lepidoptera: Nepticuloidea)

Opostegidae
Moths described in 1897